The Toy Fox Terrier is a small terrier breed of dog, directly descended from the larger Smooth Fox Terrier but since 1936, it has been registered in the USA with the UKC as a separate breed.

Description

Appearance

Toy Fox Terriers are small dogs with a muscular and athletic appearance. Notable characteristic traits include a short glossy and predominantly white coat, coupled with a predominantly solid head, and a short, high-set tail. The breed has been deemed elegant and graceful with V-shaped ears and large eyes. The tail can be short and straight or long and shiny, and breeders often shorten the tail a few days after birth by clipping it about three-fifths of the way from the tip (at the third or fourth joint). The coat is short, fine, and glossy in black  with tan, with areas of tan on the face; there are two other variants, one with 'chocolate' replacing the black in areas (the UKC does not allow this variant to be shown), another which is all white with tan and no black at all, and one which is white with black markings and no tan accents. These variants are often known as 'Tri-Color', 'Chocolate', and 'White and Tan', and 'White and Black" respectively. The height ranges from 8.5–11.5 inches at the shoulder (21.5–29.2 cm) and weight from 3.5-9.

Temperament
Toy Fox Terriers, like many active and intelligent breeds, can learn to respond to a number of words. Toy Fox Terriers were used commonly in circus shows by clowns, and they are said to make great companions for owners with a good sense of humor. As a terrier breed, they are often active, though perhaps not as active as the Jack Russell Terrier, and are said to be well suited for older owners. They are quite trainable and often cited as making wonderful companions for people with disabilities. They are also very lovable and loyal to their owners. In addition, dogs of this breed tend not to bark very much if they are trained well.

Grooming
The Toy Fox Terrier is easy to groom, although grooming is generally seen as unneeded due to how short the hairs are (under a centimeter in length most of the time). Sometimes, it is necessary to comb and brush the coat. The hairs shed very frequently.

Oral
A Toy Fox Terrier should be given denta-bones or other chewable toys to prevent, as with most small breeds, tartar build-up that can lead to periodontal disease.  As well, daily brushing has been shown to be very beneficial as well as regular dental cleanings from the vet.

Health
Toy Fox Terriers are generally a healthy breed and require little maintenance. They are active indoors and will do without a yard, as they can usually take care of their own exercise needs. They often have trouble tolerating cold weather without careful acclimation. Their life expectancy is about fifteen years. 
Toy Fox Terriers are significantly resilient, however, as with many toy breeds, some are prone to patellar luxation (slipped stifle). Legg–Calvé–Perthes syndrome and von Willebrand disease are uncommon.

History
Some Toy Fox Terrier breeders can trace their dogs' lineage back to a Smooth Fox Terrier called "Foiler", the first fox terrier registered by the Kennel Club in Britain, circa 1875–76. It is believed that careful breeding from smaller Smooth Fox Terriers without crosses to other toy breeds such as Manchester Terrier and Chihuahua resulted in the Toy Fox Terrier of today.

Toy Fox Terriers were recognized by the United Kennel Club (UKC) in 1936 and placed in the Terrier Group, and by the American Kennel Club (AKC) in 2003 (Toy Group).

See also
 Dogs portal
 List of dog breeds
 Fox Terrier, for additional details on history, genetics, coat color, etc.
 Rare breeds

References

Bibliography
 Davidson, John F., The Toy Fox Terrier - Wired for Action (a 2006 revision of The Toy Fox Terrier)
 Hopkins, Eliza and Flamholtz, Cathy The Toy Fox Terrier
 Bielsky-Braham, Tanya, Send in the Clowns. AKC Gazette, December, 2002
 Sherry Baker Krueger, Toy Fox Terrier, T.F.H. PUBLICATIONS, 1993

External links

Rare dog breeds
Terriers
Companion dogs
Dog breeds originating in the United States